SFTB may refer to:

Solution-focused brief therapy, a goal-directed collaborative approach to psychotherapeutic change
Straight from the Beek, a popular Q&A forum for Atlanta Falcons fans with columnist Matthew Tabeek on AtlantaFalcons.com
Soundtracks for the Blind, 1996 album by Swans
Started from the Bottom, 2013 single by Drake
Straight from the Barrio, 2016 album by Upon a Burning Body
Submerged floating tube bridge, tunnel that floats in water